The Dexter Horton Building (710 2nd Avenue) is a 15-story office building in Seattle, Washington, United States. It is located at the intersection of 2nd Avenue and Cherry Street in Downtown Seattle and was the headquarters of the Seattle First National Bank (Seafirst) until they moved to the Seafirst Building in 1969. The building was opened in 1924 and designed by John Graham. It underwent seismic renovations in 2002 and was sold to Gerding Edlen in 2013 for $76.6 million. The building was later sold in 2015 to a subsidiary of Great Eagle Holdings for $124.4 million. CIM Group purchased the building for $151 million in 2019; it was the third time the Dexter Horton Building had been sold in a five-year period.

Pegasus Coffee opened in the building as the first specialty coffee bar in downtown Seattle in 1983.

References

External links

 

Buildings and structures in Seattle
Downtown Seattle